The Canton of Argentré-du-Plessis is a former canton of France, in the Ille-et-Vilaine département, located in the east of the department. It was disbanded following the French canton reorganisation which came into effect in March 2015. It consisted of 9 communes, and its population was 14,523 in 2012.

References

Former cantons of Ille-et-Vilaine
2015 disestablishments in France
States and territories disestablished in 2015
Brittany region articles needing translation from French Wikipedia